August Martin may refer to:

 August Harvey Martin (1919–1968), American pilot and Tuskegee Airman
 August Eduard Martin (1847–1933), German obstetrician and gynecologist